Phoenix World Tour is the fourth concert tour by British singer Rita Ora, in support of her second studio album, Phoenix (2018). The tour began on 1 March 2019 in Melbourne, Australia.

Background 
On 29 October 2018, Ora announced tour dates across Europe, Asia and Oceania from 1 March until 29 May 2019. Access to pre-sale tickets of the tour in Europe, which took place on 31 October 2018, was made available through album pre-order. Tickets went on sale to the general public two days later, on 2 November.

This was Ora's first solo tour in Asia and Australia, and her first arena tour in the United Kingdom. Additional tour dates and music festivals appearances were announced later on.

All the scheduled tour events in 2020 were either postponed or cancelled due to the COVID-19 pandemic.

Set list
This set list is representative of the concert on 1 March 2019, in Melbourne, Australia. It is not representative of all concerts for the duration of the tour.

"For You"
"Your Song"
"Doing It"
"Let You Love Me"
"Summer Love"
"New Look"
"Girls"
"Only Want You"
"Hell of a Life"
"Soul Survivor"
"How Soon Is Now?"
"I Will Never Let You Down"
"R.I.P."
"Keep Talking"
"Black Widow"
"Hot Right Now"
"Coming Home"
Encore
"Lonely Together"
"Anywhere"

Tour dates

Cancelled shows

Notes

References

External links
 

Rita Ora concert tours
2019 concert tours
2021 concert tours
Concert tours postponed due to the COVID-19 pandemic